Storehouse may refer to:

 Storehouse plc, a British retail conglomerate
 Warehouse, a building for storing goods